Trikala Municipal Sports Hall (Dimotiko Kleisto Gymnastirio Trikalon), abbreviated as D.K. Trikalon (Δ.Κ. Τρικάλων), is an indoor sports arena that is located in Trikala, Greece. It is located next to the Trikala Municipal Stadium. It is mainly used to host basketball and volleyball games. The arena has a seating capacity of 2,500.

History
Trikala Indoor Hall was originally opened in the year 1985, and was renovated and expanded in 2009, by the basketball club Trikala 2000, in order to better meet the needs of the top-tier Greek Basket League, for the club's home games. The arena was renovated again, when the basketball club Trikala Aries joined the top-tier Greek League, with Trikala Indoor Hall being their home arena. The arena has also been used to host home games of the men's Greek national volleyball team.

There are plans to further expand the arena again, in order to meet the 2nd-tier EuroCup's 3,000 seat minimum capacity.

References

External links
Image 1 of Trikala Municipal Sports Hall's Interior
Image 2 of Trikala Municipal Sports Hall's Interior

Basketball venues in Greece
Indoor arenas in Greece
Volleyball venues in Greece
Sport in Trikala
Buildings and structures in Trikala

el:Δημοτικό Κλειστό Γυμναστήριο Τρικάλων